John George (20 April 1910 – 14 April 2000) was an Australian rules footballer who played with Collingwood, St Kilda and South Melbourne in the Victorian Football League (VFL).

George, who played his football as a defender and ruckman, began his career at Collingwood in 1930, the year they won their record fourth successive premiership. He however took no part in the finals series.

He struggled to put together regular games until 1933, when he made 16 appearances for St Kilda.

References

1910 births
Collingwood Football Club players
St Kilda Football Club players
Sydney Swans players
Williamstown Football Club players
Australian rules footballers from Victoria (Australia)
2000 deaths